April Rose may refer to:

 April Rose Haydock (born 1987), American model, actress, writer, and producer
 April Rose Pengilly (born 1988), Australian actress and former model
 April Rose Wilkens (born 1970), American murder convict
 April Rose (politician) (born 1968), American politician